Matthew Mitchell (born July 19, 1975) is an American jazz pianist and composer. He is also part of the faculty of the New York-based Center for Improvisational Music.

Early life
Mitchell was born on July 19, 1975. He grew up in Exton, Pennsylvania. He first played the piano aged six, and composed from the age of 10. He had lessons in jazz and theory at a university from the age of 12. At this stage he was influenced by pianists Keith Jarrett and Herbie Hancock.

Later life and career
Mitchell attended Indiana University for three years and then, in the late 1990s, he completed a master's degree at the Eastman School of Music and settled in New York. In 1999, he contacted saxophonist Tim Berne for some of his scores, but did not pursue the contact further at that point. Mitchell had various jobs in New York, but chose to return to Philadelphia. He then worked in a library at The University of the Arts for nine years before leaving when he had too many gigs to fit in.

In 2011, Mitchell had a sextet named Central Chain. In 2012, Mitchell introduced a new trio, with Chris Tordini on bass and Dan Weiss on drums. In the early 2010s, Mitchell was also part of Berne's Snakeoil band, and John Hollenbeck's Large Ensemble and Claudia Quintet.

In 2014, Mitchell joined Rudresh Mahanthappa's band, and recorded with the saxophonist later that year.

Mitchell has written and published several collections of études. His 2017 release A Pouting Grimace is"a 10-part suite extrapolated from a one-bar vamp reminiscent of Roscoe Mitchell's 1977 piece 'Nonaah'."

Playing style
A New York Times reviewer commented in 2011 that Mitchell "feels close to the consensus language of straight-ahead jazz but wants to get beyond it. He does it with hands moving in independent parts, with polyrhythms, with music that approaches the technical level of études but that churns and whirls and leaves spaces for broad interpretation." Mitchell has been described as "a chameleon, able to take on completely different musical personas across of fast array of situations."

Another New York Times reviewer observed that "Mitchell has his guideposts as an improviser, including Paul Bley and Andrew Hill, pioneers of stubborn poise and self-containment". Mitchell's playing reflects a thorough understanding of his predecessors but remains powerfully singular: "Mitchell is special [...] because he weaves together understanding of perhaps four distinct and critical jazz piano traditions, pulling in impressionistic texture from Bill Evans/Herbie Hancock, ravenous but dynamic attack from Cecil Taylor/Don Pullen, the rhythmic rush of Bud Powell, and the comfort with abstract melodic logic of Paul Bley. Does Mitchell, therefore, sound schizophrenic or derivative? No – over and over he sounds like himself: the most complete and well-integrated improvising pianist of the last 15 years."

Compositions
Mitchell commented that "I aim to think compositionally when improvising and think improvisationally when composing – trying to expand what is possible in both scenarios."

Awards
Mitchell was awarded a Pew Fellowships in the Arts in 2012.

Discography
An asterisk (*) indicates that the year is that of release.

As leader/co-leader

As sideman

References

1975 births
Living people
American jazz pianists
American male pianists
21st-century American pianists
21st-century American male musicians
American male jazz musicians
Pi Recordings artists